Tavriiske (Таврійське) is a village in Ukraine. Scheromet was the German name of a village which was settled by Hutterites from 1868 to 1874, when the Hutterites left for Canada.

Geography 
Tavriiske is located on the right bank of the Konka River, opposite the village Yurkivka (Юрківка) and on the Territorial Road T-08-03. The village is the administrative center of a district municipality in the center of Zaporizhzhia District, located about 50 km southeast of Zaporizhzhia Oblast center Zaporizhzhia and 14 km northwest of the district center Orikhiv.

History 

Incorporated in 1798, the village developed from a farm that was founded in 1770. It then bore the name Zherebets (Жеребець) until 1939, then the name Kirove (Ukrainian: Кірове, Russian Кирово/Kirowo) until 12 May 2016 when it was renamed to the current name to comply with decommunization in Ukraine. The village has a railway station on the railway line Zaporizhia-Polohy.

References 

German communities in Ukraine
Hutterite communities in Europe
Hutterites in Ukraine
Former German settlements in Zaporizhzhia Oblast
German diaspora in Europe
Protestantism in Ukraine

Zaporizhzhia Raion
Villages in Zaporizhzhia Raion